Stephen Zeh is a basket weaver in rural Temple, Maine in the U.S. He uses brown ash that he harvests from the woods near his home, strips it into splints, and enlaces them into baskets. He is mostly self-taught and has been weaving for more than 30 years.

Zeh is represented in the collection of the Smithsonian American Art Museum with Swing Handle Apple Basket, a 2001 work in black ash and brass.

References

External links
Stephen Zeh; Basketmaker website

Living people
Basket weavers
People from Temple, Maine
Year of birth missing (living people)
20th-century American artists
20th-century American male artists
21st-century American artists
21st-century American male artists
Artists from Maine